Karen Murphy, R.N., Ph.D., is an American registered nurse and healthcare administrator. She previously served as the Pennsylvania Secretary of Health, having been nominated by Pennsylvania Governor Tom Wolf and confirmed in May 2015. Prior to that, she served as Pennsylvania Director of the State Innovation Models Initiative and CEO of the Moses Taylor Health System. Murphy received a registered nurse diploma from the Scranton State Hospital School of Nursing. She holds a Bachelor of Science from the University of Scranton (1991), a Master of Business Administration from Marywood University, and a Doctorate of Philosophy in Business Administration from the Fox School of Business and Management at Temple University. Murphy worked at Moses Taylor Hospital in Scranton, Pennsylvania, for 34 years, beginning in 1977, when she was hired by the hospital as a registered nurse. She became president and CEO of Mose Taylor Hospital in 2009. On January 5, 2012, Murphy announced her departure from Mose Taylor, just two days after the $152-million dollar acquisition of Moses Taylor Hospital by a for-profit company, Community Health Systems Inc. She took a temporary, two-month interim leadership position at a new community foundation created by the sale.

References

Living people
State cabinet secretaries of Pennsylvania
American nurses
American women nurses
Fox School of Business and Management alumni
University of Scranton alumni
Marywood University alumni
American women chief executives
American health care chief executives
Year of birth missing (living people)
21st-century American women